Mahathir Mohamad formed the fourth Mahathir cabinet after being invited by Tuanku Azlan Shah to begin a new government following the 21 October 1990 general election in Malaysia. Prior to the election, Mahathir led (as Prime Minister) the third Mahathir cabinet, a coalition government that consisted of members of the component parties of Barisan Nasional. It was the 12th cabinet of Malaysia formed since independence.

This is a list of the members of the fourth cabinet of the fourth Prime Minister of Malaysia, Mahathir Mohamad.

Composition

Full members
The federal cabinet consisted of the following ministers:

Deputy ministers

See also
 Members of the Dewan Rakyat, 8th Malaysian Parliament
 List of parliamentary secretaries of Malaysia#Fourth Mahathir cabinet

References

Cabinet of Malaysia
1990 establishments in Malaysia
1995 disestablishments in Malaysia
Cabinets established in 1990
Cabinets disestablished in 1995